Virgin Bhasskar is an Indian comedy web series created by Akanksha Shukla and produced by Ekta Kapoor and Shobha Kapoor under their banner Balaji Telefilms for their video-on-demand streaming platform ALT Balaji and ZEE5. The series is directed by Sakshat Dalvi and Sangieta Rao. The season 1 of the series premiered on 19 November 2019 on ZEE5 and season 2 premiered on 29 August 2020.

The series stars Anant Joshi, Rutpanna Aishwarya, and Dherendra Kumar Tiwari as protagonists and revolves around the life of an erotic novelist who desperately wants to lose his virginity.

Synopsis 
The series revolves around Bhaskar Tripathi who is an erotic novelist but the irony of his life is that he is still a virgin. The series explores his life when he falls in love with Vidhi Pandey, daughter of a police officer whom he loves her and wants to lose his virginity only to her.

Cast

Episodes

Reception 
The show received mixed reviews on its opening, while audience rated 6.8 stars on IMDb.

References

External links 

 Virgin Bhasskar on ALTBalaji

 Virgin Bhasskar on ZEE5

Indian comedy web series
2019 web series debuts
ALTBalaji original programming
ZEE5 original programming
Hindi-language web series